"Labyrinth" is a song by American singer-songwriter Taylor Swift, and is the tenth track from Swift's tenth studio album, Midnights (2022). Written and produced by Swift and Jack Antonoff, it is a muted dance-pop and synth-pop track which draws elements from alternative music, with a production consisting of filtered synthesizer tones, low-pitched vocals, and influences from trap and house. In the lyrics, the narrator expresses anxiety towards newfound romance. The song peaked at number 14 on the Billboard Hot 100 and number 12 on the Billboard Global 200.

Background 
On August 28, 2022, singer-songwriter Taylor Swift announced her tenth studio album during the MTV Video Music Awards, set to be released on October 21. Shortly after, Swift revealed the name of the album, Midnights, and its album cover. The tracklist was not revealed. A month after the announcement, Swift began a series titled Midnights Mayhem With Me on social networks. In the series, Swift used a lottery machine to randomly select table tennis balls labeled with a number ranging from one to thirteen, and announce the title of the track with the corresponding number. In the eleventh episode of the series, the tenth track of the album was announced, named "Labyrinth."

Composition and lyrics 
"Labyrinth" is the longest track on Midnights, lasting four minutes and seven seconds. It is a muted synth-pop and dance-pop track that incorporates prominent electronic elements, with an electronic piano serving as a key instrument. It incorporates dubstep-influenced bass, trap-and-house-influenced beats, and filtered synthesizer tones. Swift sings with her upper register throughout much of the track until her vocals are manipulated to a lower pitch later. Alexis Petridis of The Guardian commented that the vocal effects "warp [Swift's] voice to a point of androgyny". In the Associated Press, Elise Ryan found "Labyrinth" to be a combination of musical styles on Swift's past albums—the synth-pop of 1989 and the alternative of Folklore. The track is composed in the key of C major and follows a tempo of 110 beats per minute. It uses a chord progression of I–IV(add 9)–vi–IV(add 9).

In the lyrics, Swift sings about exploring a new relationship, but with a substantial amount of hesitancy, represented in the song's chorus. The narrator realizes she falls in love but wonders if it is happening too fast; "Oh, I'm falling in love / I thought the plane was going down / How'd you turn it right around?" At one point, the lyrics, "Breathe in, breathe through, breathe deep, breathe out", reference Swift's 2022 commencement speech at New York University. Petridis found the lyrics to defy gender stereotyping surrounding women.

Critical reception 
"Labyrinth" was met with generally positive reviews from critics. Quinn Moreland of Pitchfork states "the production mirrors the ice melting around her heart, each synth quiver a pump of new blood." Brittany Spanos of Rolling Stone describes the track, along with "Maroon", as "straightforward reckonings with love potentially lost." Mary Kate Carr from The A.V. Club picked "Labyrinth" as one of the most underrated Midnights tracks; she hailed it as one of "the most deceptively simple yet hauntingly beautiful tracks" in Swift's entire catalog. In disagreement, Callie Ahlgrim and Courteney Larocca of Insider describe the track as "an understandable inclusion on the album," despite their postulation that some might find the track boring. In The Times, critic Will Hodgkinson found the vocal manipulation "modish" and "off-putting".

Commercial performance
After the release of Midnights, all tracks of the standard edition debuted within the top-15 of the Billboard Global 200 chart simultaneously; "Labyrinth" was at number 12. In the United States, it debuted and peaked at number 14 on the Billboard Hot 100. The track peaked on the Canadian Hot 100 at number 14 and was certified gold from Music Canada on November 29, 2022. "Labyrinth" appeared on various single charts, at number 10 in the Philippines, number 13 in Australia and Singapore, number 22 in Malaysia, number 28 in Vietnam, number 32 in Portugal, number 52 in Sweden, number 58 in Switzerland, number 60 in Czech Republic, number 64 in Lithuania, number 65 in Slovakia, and number 81 in Spain.

Credits and personnel 
Credits are adapted from Pitchfork.

Recording
 Recorded at Rough Customer Studio (Brooklyn) and Electric Lady Studios (New York City)
 Mixed at MixStar Studios (Virginia Beach)
 Mastered at Sterling Sound (Edgewater, New Jersey)

Personnel
 Taylor Swift – vocals, songwriting, production
 Jack Antonoff – songwriting, production, programming, percussion, Juno 6, Realistic Synth, OB8, Moog, electric guitars, background vocals, recording
 Megan Searl – assistant engineer
 Jon Sher – assistant engineer
 John Rooney – assistant engineer
 Serban Ghenea – mixing engineer
 Bryce Bordone – assistant mix engineer
 Randy Merrill – mastering engineer
 Laura Sisk – recording

Charts

Certification

References 

2022 songs
Taylor Swift songs
Songs written by Taylor Swift
Songs written by Jack Antonoff
Song recordings produced by Taylor Swift
Song recordings produced by Jack Antonoff
Dance-pop songs
American synth-pop songs